Mauro Alessio Savastano (born 16 April 1997) is a Dutch professional footballer who plays for Dordrecht as a defender.

Club career
Savastano is a youth exponent from Ajax. He made his professional debut for Jong Ajax on 16 March 2015 in an Eerste Divisie game against Fortuna Sittard replacing Terry Lartey Sanniez at half-time in a 3–0 home win.

In July 2021, Savastano signed with Dordrecht after having spent a year as a free agent following his release by Jong AZ in June 2020.

Personal life
Born in the Netherlands, Savastano is of Italian descent.

References

1997 births
Living people
Footballers from Zaanstad
Association football fullbacks
Dutch footballers
Dutch people of Italian descent
AFC Ajax players
Jong Ajax players
Go Ahead Eagles players
Jong AZ players
FC Dordrecht players
Eerste Divisie players